Aleksandr Petrovich Cherevko (born 28 November 1987) is a Ukrainian-born Russian former professional football player who played as right back.

Club career
He made his Russian Premier League debut for FC Tom Tomsk on 19 October 2013 in a game against FC Krasnodar.

Career statistics

Notes

External links
 

1987 births
People from Kherson Oblast
Living people
Russian footballers
Russia youth international footballers
Association football midfielders
FC Nizhny Novgorod (2007) players
FC Tom Tomsk players
Russian Premier League players
FC SKA-Khabarovsk players
FC Lokomotiv Moscow players
FC Dynamo Saint Petersburg players
FC Fakel Voronezh players